Siuslaw High School is a public high school in the northwest United States, located in Florence, Oregon. It is named after the local Siuslaw River, and the current principal is Michael Harklerode.

History 
Siuslaw High School was originally located on Quince St in Florence.  The athletic field consisted of a cinder track with a dirt infield behind the junior high school which both the junior and senior high schools used. The football field, "Hans Peterson Memorial Field," was located southwest of both schools on 2nd street. The old high school building has been torn down and, as of 2021, the lot is vacant.

The current school was first occupied in September 1970, with the first graduating class being the class of 1971.  In 1970, the location of the school was considered outside the city limits and students who lived in town had to be bussed to the school or, as many did, walked or drove. The area's student population comes from a large geographic region, with students coming from the north at Sea Lion Caves, east to Tiernan up the North Fork of the Siuslaw River, south to the county line and all points east of Woahink and Siltcoos lakes (Canary).
The middle and high school still share a track and football field, located at the middle school. In the summer of 2019, the facility went under construction for resurfacing of the track.

Academics 

In 2008, 72% of the school's seniors received their high school diploma. Of 144 students, 104 graduated, 27 dropped out, 1 received a modified diploma, and 12 are still in high school.

Athletics 
Siuslaw competes at a 4A level, with the exception of football that plays at 3A.

In the 20th century, Siuslaw had a long-standing rivalry with Reedsport High School.

References

External links 
 

High schools in Lane County, Oregon
Public high schools in Oregon